Peter Andrew Cruddas, Baron Cruddas (born 30 September 1953) is an English banker and businessman. He is the founder of online trading company CMC Markets. In the 2007 Sunday Times Rich List, he was named the richest man in the City of London, with an estimated fortune of £860 million. As of March 2012, Forbes estimated his wealth at $1.3 billion, equivalent to £830 million at the time.

Cruddas was appointed Conservative Party co-treasurer in June 2011. In March 2012 it was alleged by The Sunday Times that he had offered access to the Prime Minister David Cameron and the Chancellor George Osborne, in exchange for cash donations of between £100,000 and £250,000. Cruddas resigned the same day.

In June 2013, Cruddas successfully sued The Sunday Times for libel over its coverage of him, which the High Court found had been defamatory. However, in March 2015, an appeal court reduced the libel damages from the original £180,000 to £50,000, ruling that the Sunday Timess central allegation around "cash for access" had been borne out by the facts, while also ruling that a series of subsidiary allegations made in the same Sunday Times article were still false and defamatory.

In December 2020, it was announced he would be conferred a life peerage after a nomination by Prime Minister Boris Johnson, despite the contrary advice of the House of Lords Appointments Commission, which unanimously recommended that the Prime Minister rescind his nomination. It was later reported that he donated £500,000 to the Conservative Party days after being elevated to the House of Lords.

Early life
The son of a father who worked at Smithfield Market, Cruddas has an elder brother John and a twin brother Stephen, both of whom became taxi drivers. Born in the Metropolitan Borough of Hackney, the boys initially lived on the Bracklyn Court Estate, before moving to Vince Court when the twins were six. Cruddas states his membership of the Boy Scouts as the reason for his early success, who taught him self-discipline and self-confidence:

Career
He left Shoreditch Comprehensive with no qualifications, aged 15, and gained a job as a telex operator for Western Union in the City of London. After being made redundant, he worked in the foreign currency trading rooms of various banks, including the Bank of Iran and Marine Midland.

By 1989, Cruddas was the head foreign exchange dealer at the City of London branch of the Jordanian-based Petra Bank. He left the same year to set up his own business, starting CMC Markets with £10,000 in the bank. CMC Markets is currently valued at between £750 million and £1.2 billion.

Cruddas is the largest individual donor to the Duke of Edinburgh Award International Association, a board member of the Prince's Trust, and has donated to Great Ormond Street Hospital.

Cruddas supported the Royal Opera House and The Royal Ballet, and after becoming a member of the Chairman's Circle, in March 2012 was invited to become a Trustee and join the Board of the Royal Opera House.

Politics
In total, it is believed that Cruddas has donated over £3,000,000 to the Conservative Party. On 31 July 2013 on the BBC's Newsnight programme he stated that he had donated over £1,000,000. He donated £100,000 in the last quarter of 2010 and £50,000 in the first week of the 2010 general election campaign. The Sunday Times reported that on 5 February 2021, a week after he received a peerage, Cruddas' donations topped £3 million.

Cruddas was appointed Conservative Party co-treasurer in June 2011 alongside Lord Fink, effectively the party's chief fund raiser, in succession to billionaire property tycoon David Rowland.

In March 2012 it was alleged by The Sunday Times that he had offered access to the Prime Minister David Cameron, and the Chancellor George Osborne. The Sunday Times had secretly filmed Cruddas allegedly discussing what level of access different size donations led to: "£200,000 to £250,000 is Premier League – things will open up for you – you can ask him practically any question you want." Cruddas resigned the same day.

The undercover journalists were introduced to Cruddas by Sarah Southern, a lobbyist who is David Cameron's former aide. The undercover reporters posed as overseas financiers and claimed that their clients intended to buy distressed government assets and wanted to make political connections.

In July 2012, the ConservativeHome blog reported that Cruddas was suing The Sunday Times for libel over its coverage of him. In June 2013, the High Court ruled in his favour and found that The Sunday Times articles had been defamatory. He was awarded £180,000 in damages on 31 July. However, in March 2015, all three judges of an appeal court ruled that the central allegation of the Sunday Times's story – that Crudas had offered "cash for access" to potential donors – was supported by the evidence, while they also ruled that a series of accompanying allegations made in the same Sunday Times article were still false and defamatory. Accordingly, they reduced the Sunday Times libel damages from £180,000 to £50,000.

In June 2019, Sky News reported that Cruddas donated £50,000 to Boris Johnson's Conservative leadership campaign.

In 2020, Cruddas was nominated by the leader of the Conservative Party and Prime Minister Boris Johnson for a peerage. The House of Lords Appointments Commission advised that it could not support his nomination. Johnson nonetheless decided that the appointment should proceed, becoming the first ever prime minister to overrule an advice of the commission.

On 27 January 2021 he was created Baron Cruddas', of Shoreditch in the London Borough of Hackney.

Following the resignation of Boris Johnson and the subsequent leadership election, Cruddas led a campaign to place Johnson on the members' ballot, stating that the mass resignations leading to his resignation were "anti-democratic to the party and to the electorate." Cruddas is the president of the Conservative Democratic Organisation, a pro-Johnson pressure group in the Conservative Party founded in December 2022, with a stated aim to make the party "representative of the membership".

Personal life
Cruddas has four children, two from each marriage. His second wife is Fiona.

He is reported to have been a regular attendee of the Presidents Club Charity Dinner, an annual event for men only, where many hostesses were groped, propositioned and harassed.

Cruddas was resident in Monaco for a period until March 2009, commuting daily from an apartment on Avenue des Spélugues to London City Airport. In an interview in early 2011 he stated that he had: "A £10m apartment in Monaco, a £5m house in Hertfordshire, a house in Antibes, a yacht and a private jet." He plays golf with a low handicap, composes quatrains, and supports Arsenal F.C.

In 2016, Cruddas and his wife Fiona paid £42 million in cash for Balfour House, a seven-storey Victorian mansion close to Park Lane in London's Mayfair, formerly owned by the Iranian-born art dealer Nasser Khalili, who lived there for 22 years.

References

External links
Peter Cruddas Foundation
CMC Markets

1953 births
Living people
People from Hackney Central
English bankers
Businesspeople from London
English expatriates in Monaco
English philanthropists
British billionaires
Conservative Party (UK) officials
British Eurosceptics
Conservative Party (UK) donors
Conservative Party (UK) life peers
Life peers created by Elizabeth II